The Sphaerodactylidae are a family of geckos (Gekkota) distributed in North America, Central America, South America, and the Caribbean, as well as in Southern Europe, North Africa, the Middle East, and into Central Asia. The family contains 12 living genera and over 200 living species.

Genera
The following genera are recognized as valid:

References

Further reading

Geckos
Lizard families